Porosteognathus is an extinct genus of therocephalian therapsids. Remains have been found at Isheevo in Russia (Republic of Tatarstan). It is known from the Middle Permian.

References

Extinct animals of Russia
Scylacosaurids
Therocephalia genera
Fossil taxa described in 1955